Viability is the ability of a thing (a living organism, an artificial system, an idea, etc.) to maintain itself or recover its potentialities.

Viability or viable may refer to:

Biology, medicine or ecology
 Viability selection, the selection of individual organisms who can survive until they are able to reproduce
 Fetal viability, the ability of a fetus to survive outside of the uterus
 Genetic viability, chance of a population of plants or animals to avoid the problems of inbreeding
 Minimum viable population, a lower bound on the population of a species, such that it can survive in the wild
 Population viability analysis, a species-specific method of risk assessment frequently used in conservation biology
 Viable count, of viable cells

Business
 Viability study, a study of the profitability of a business concept which is to be converted into a business
 Minimum viable product, in product development, a strategy used for fast and quantitative market testing of a product or product feature

Other uses
 Viable Paradise, an annual one-week writing workshop held each autumn on Martha's Vineyard
 Viable system model, a scientific model by Stafford Beer of the organization of a viable or autonomous system
 Viable system theory, a modelling approach that enables complex strategic and operative business and financial systems to be modelled and explored.
 Viability theory, an area of mathematics that studies the evolution of dynamical systems under constraints to the system's state

See also
 Viability assay, an assay to determine the ability of cells or tissues to maintain or recover its viability
 
 Via (disambiguation)